Mary Walsh may refer to:

Mary Walsh (actress) (born 1952), Canadian comedian and actress
Mary Walsh (Dublin camogie player), former camogie player, captain of the All Ireland Camogie Championship winning team in 1937
Mary Walsh (journalist), US producer at CBS news
Mary Walsh (politician) (1929–1976), Irish Fine Gael Senator
Mary Lee (suffragette) (1821–1909), suffragette born Mary Walsh
Mary Walsh (Wexford camogie player), former camogie player, captain of the All Ireland Camogie Championship winning team in 1968
Mary Beth Walsh, member of the New York State Assembly
Mary Williams Walsh (born 1955), American investigative journalist
Mary E. Walsh, American composer

Fictional 
Mary Walsh, main character in Abandoned